Wah Wah Records Sounds is a Spanish record shop and label based in Barcelona.

Starting in 1992 as a record shop, in 1999 Wah Wah started reissuing records which had previously been issued by various companies.

There are four categories of music they issue:
 Rock Sounds — beat, garage, R&B, psych and prog sounds
 Black Sounds — jazz, soul, funk and Brazilian sounds
 Mondo Bizarre — 'cool & strange music', exotica, surf, groovy beats "and other strange sounds"
 Wah Wah's New Sounds — new productions

Releases 
With a few exceptions, which are also available on CD, releases from Wah Wah are only available on vinyl.

As of May 2012, Wah Wah have issued 119 titles:

References 

Spanish record labels
Record labels established in 1999
1999 establishments in Catalonia